Maya-Gozel Aymedova (born 28 May 1941 in Ashkhabad, Turkmen SSR, USSR), also known as Maya-Gozel Aimedova, is a Turkmen actress. Her most famous role is in the 1972 film Nevestka (Daughter-in-Law).

Film career
Aimedova graduated from the Lunacharsky State Institute for Theatre Arts in 1964, and joined the Turkmenistan Young Spectator's Theatre in Ashgabat. Her onscreen debut was in Sluchai v Dash-Kale (Incident in Dash-Kala, 1961), in which she played a teacher who fights against outdated marriage practices. In 1972, she starred in Nevestka, for which she was awarded a USSR State Prize.

Nevestka was directed by Khodjakuli Narliev, with whom she worked on a number of films, including Kogda zhenshchina osedlaet konia (When a Woman Saddles a Horse, 1975) and Derevo Dzhamal (Djamal's Tree, 1980). For both of these films, she also co-wrote the screenplay.

Her last film role was in the 1990 film Mankurt. After Turkmenistan gained independence in 1991, the country's film industry was suppressed.

Personal life
Aimedova is married to Khodjakuli Narliev. She joined the Communist Party in 1971.

Awards and honours
1972 - USSR State Prize
1982 - People's Artist of Turkmen SSR
1987 - People's Artist of the USSR

Filmography
Sluchai v Dash-Kale (Incident in Dash-Kala, 1961)
Nevestka (Daughter-in-Law, 1972)
Kogda zhenshchina osedlaet konia (When a Woman Saddles a Horse, 1975)
Umei skazat' net (You Must Be Able to Say No, 1976)
Derevo Dzhamal (Djamal's Tree, 1980)
Karakumy, 45 gradusov v teni (Karakumy, 45 Degrees in the Shade, 1982)
Fragi - razluchennyi so schast'em (Fragi - Separated from Happiness, 1984)
Do svidaniia, moi parfinianin (Goodbye, My Parthian, 1987)
Beshenaia (The Mad Woman, 1988)
Mankurt (1990)

References

External links

1941 births
Turkmenistan actresses
Living people
People from Ashgabat
Russian Academy of Theatre Arts alumni
Academicians of the Russian Academy of Cinema Arts and Sciences "Nika"
Soviet film actresses
Turkmenistan film actresses
20th-century Turkmenistan actresses
20th-century Turkmenistan women
People's Artists of the USSR
Recipients of the USSR State Prize
Communist Party of the Soviet Union members